Marco Cecchinato was the defending champion, but withdrew due to illness.

Matteo Berrettini won the title, defeating Filip Krajinović in the final, 4–6, 6–3, 6–1.

Seeds
The top four seeds received a bye into the second round.

Draw

Finals

Top half

Bottom half

Qualifying

Seeds

Qualifiers

Lucky losers

Qualifying draw

First qualifier

Second qualifier

Third qualifier

Fourth qualifier

References

External Links
 Main draw
 Qualifying draw

Hungarian Open - Singles
2019 Singles